The Pakistan Army Artillery Corps, formally the Regiment of Artillery is an administrative corps of the Pakistan Army tasked with operating field artillery including muzzle-projectile weapons. Despite the name, the Regiment is itself composed of a number of battalion-sized regiments, most of which are operationally deployed as part of Army corps and divisions.

History 
The Regiment was initially part of the British Indian Army, but linked itself with Royal Artillery and was later integrated with the Royal Indian Artillery. However, its modern history started in 1947 with the establishment of Pakistan.  First founded as the Royal Pakistan Artillery, it was re-designed on 23 March 1956, and since then it has been known as Regiment of Artillery. In 1947, the Regiment inherited only eight gun regiments, one survey battery, an air observation post flight, and two formation headquarters. Its earlier commanders were from the British Army. However, in 1955, with the help and assistance received from the United States Army's Field Artillery Branch through U.S. aid, the Regiment did away with its British Army organisation. The regiments in the British system were equipped with 24 guns held in three batteries, further divided into two troops of 4 guns each. Pakistan adopted the US system of 18 guns in each regiment, divided in three batteries of 6 guns each. Gun troop was done away with. The Regiment first earned renown in Indo-Pakistani war of 1947, and also actively participated in the Indo-Pakistani war of 1965 where approximately 550 guns participated in the conflict. However, its performance was criticised in the Bangladesh Liberation War, followed by the Indo-Pakistani war of 1971, where it failed to produce any effective results.

After the 1971 conflict, the Regiment was re-organised and more advanced courses were introduced. Since 1971, the Regiment has emerged as one of the most potent combat arms in the Pakistan Army. It participated in notable operations and wars involving Pakistan at numerous occasions and time intervals.

Right after joining the artillery, the officers and personnel are sent to the School of Artillery which was established by the Pakistan Army in 1947 at Nowshera. From the period of 1947-1955, massive re-organization and re-establishment took place and, on 11 November 1958, the research and development cell was placed, followed by a Physics and Mathematics division which was also established the same year. Since its inception, it has been mandatory for all personnel and officers to attend and pass these courses with advanced grades, before reaching a commissioned service and active duty.

Units 

 School of Artillery, Nowshera
 1 SP Medium Regiment Artillery
 3 Medium Regiment Artillery
 4 Medium Regiment Artillery
 5 MLRS Regiment
 7 Field Regiment Artillery
 10 Medium Regiment Artillery
 15 SP Medium Regiment Artillery
 16 (SP) Medium Regiment Artillery
 17 Locating Regiment Artillery
 24 Medium Regiment Artillery
 27 Medium Regiment Artillery
 28 Medium Regiment Artillery
 30 (SP) Heavy Regiment Artillery
 32 Medium Regiment Artillery
 35 SP (Heavy) Regiment
 39 (SP) Medium Regiment Artillery
 44 (SP) Medium Regiment Artillery
 45 Field Regiment Artillery
 46 Field Regiment Artillery
 48 Field Regiment Artillery
 51 Medium Regiment Artillery
 54 Medium Regiment Artillery
 61 Medium Regiment Artillery

 63 Medium Regiment Artillery
 64 Medium Regiment Artillery
 72 (SP) Medium Regiment Artillery
 79 Field Regiment Artillery
 93 Medium Regiment Artillery
 118 Medium Regiment Artillery
 140 (SP) Medium Regiment Artillery
 150 Medium Regiment Artillery
 154 Medium Regiment Artillery
 156 Locating Regiment Artillery
 159 Locating Regiment
 162 Field Regiment Artillery
 165 Field Regiment Artillery 
 170 Field Regiment Artillery
 172 MBRL Regiment
 174 Medium Regiment Artillery
 176 Missile Regiment Artillery
 181 Missile Regiment Artillery
 184 (SP) Medium Regiment Artillery
 185 Mountain Regiment Artillery
 189 Missile Regiment Artillery
 197 Missile Regiment Artillery
 198 Missile Regiment Artillery

Key
 SP = Self Propelled
 MBRL = Multi Barrel Rocket Launcher
 MLRS = Multiple Launching Rocket System

References

External links 
 
 Regiment of Artillery: History
 Regiment of Artillery: Present war

Military units and formations established in 1948
1947 establishments in Pakistan
Artillery